Mark Knowles and Daniel Nestor were the defending champions but lost in the quarterfinals to Ellis Ferreira and Patrick Galbraith.

Ferreira and Galbraith won in the final 6–3, 3–6, 6–1 against Rick Leach and Jonathan Stark.

Seeds
Champion seeds are indicated in bold text while text in italics indicates the round in which those seeds were eliminated. All eight seeded teams received byes to the second round.

Draw

Final

Top half

Bottom half

External links
 ATP draw

U.S. National Indoor Championships
1997 ATP Tour